The Ole Miss–Vanderbilt football rivalry is an American college football rivalry between the Ole Miss Rebels football team of the University of Mississippi and Vanderbilt Commodores football team of Vanderbilt University. The Rebels are the Commodores' second-longest, continuous football rivalry.

Both teams are founding members of the Southeastern Conference (SEC), and their universities have two of the three smallest student body populations among SEC schools. This similar size, the schools' proximity to one another, and the similar culture of Greek life (both schools' student bodies have high percentages of participation in fraternities and sororities) led them to be picked as annual inter-divisional rivals when the SEC grew to twelve teams for the 1992 season.

Series history
The first game between the two teams was played on would later be named Currey Field on Vanderbilt's campus in Nashville, Tennessee on November 10, 1894. That year the Commodores, led by Coach Henry Thorton and W.J. Keller, led Vanderbilt to a 40–0 win over the Mississippi Flood (as the Rebels were known until 1936).

Early in the series, Vanderbilt dominated under legendary Coach Dan McGugin (for whom the Vanderbilt athletics complex is named). Vanderbilt won the first 18 games played. The two teams played 10 times before Ole Miss even scored against Vanderbilt (scoring 2 points in a 1910 loss in Nashville). It was during this period that Vanderbilt won a game by the largest margin between the teams, winning 91–0 on October 23, 1915.

Ole Miss would not beat Vanderbilt until 1939, when the newly christened Rebels welcomed the Commodores for Vanderbilt's first away game against Ole Miss on November 4. The Rebels won, 14–7.

World War II intervened, and the teams didn't play again until 1945. But when they did, Ole Miss remembered their last game, and the Rebels recorded their first win in Nashville, 14–7, on October 6, 1945.

In 1947, the Commodores were ranked No. 10 in the country, and the Rebels were No. 18. At a packed game in Nashville, Vanderbilt won a close contest, 10–6.

As the 1950s wore on, the Rebels began to dominate the series. Vanderbilt won 34–20 in 1951, but the Commodores wouldn't beat the Rebels again until 1974. In the meantime, the Rebels went 17–0–2 against Vanderbilt, with the ties coming in 1952 and 1964. It was during this period that Ole Miss was consistently ranked in the nation's Top 10, with the Commodores losing to a no. 2-ranked Ole Miss squad in 1960 and 1961.

While Ole Miss continued to win more games in the 1980s and 90s, Vanderbilt fared better during the middle decades of the century, going 18–6. The 1989 game was perhaps the most memorable of this period, but in a tragic fashion; Ole Miss cornerback Chucky Mullins suffered a broken neck during the game that left him a quadriplegic. Mullins would die from complications of the injury in 1991.

Series record
Ole Miss leads the series 54–40–2, but the Rebels didn't assume the series lead until their 1986 win. Prior to 1967, some games between the two teams were not played at their on-campus stadiums. Besides Oxford and Nashville, the Rebels and Commodores have also squared off in Memphis, Tennessee, and Jackson, Mississippi.

The Rebels and Commodores did not play in the State of Mississippi until 1948, but Ole Miss leads the series when playing in Mississippi (27–6). Vanderbilt leads when games are played in Nashville (27–24–2).

Seventeen meetings have featured at least one team ranked in the Top 25.

Game results

See also  
 List of NCAA college football rivalry games

References

College football rivalries in the United States
Ole Miss Rebels football
Vanderbilt Commodores football